Clyde High School may refer to:

Clyde High School (Ohio), Clyde, Ohio
Clyde High School (Texas), Clyde, Texas